Gunman's Walk is a 1958 American CinemaScope Western film directed by Phil Karlson and starring Van Heflin and Tab Hunter.

Plot
Davy Hackett (James Darren) and his hot-tempered, arrogant older brother Ed (Tab Hunter) are about to assist their rancher father Lee (Van Heflin) on a horse roundup. The brothers meet Cecily "Clee" Chouard (Kathryn Grant), a beautiful half-French, half-Sioux woman; when Ed makes unwanted advances toward her, Davy, himself genuinely interested in her, apologizes for his brother's behavior.

Clee's brother Paul (Bert Convy) and two other Indians are invited to join the roundup. Ed particularly resents the hard-working, talented Paul. Ed is obsessed with capturing an elusive white mare, ostensibly for Davy, and cannot bear the fact that Paul decides to compete for the animal. During a wild chase after the horse, Ed rides the other man to his death off a cliff. This is witnessed by the two Indians and Ed is arrested. When the case comes to court, Ed is released when a man named Sieverts (Ray Teal) lies that he saw what happened: the cliff gave way and the death was an accident. Lee learns that Davy is in love with Clee and disowns him.

Sieverts claims he has lost a group of wild horses he had gathered; Lee allows him  ten of his as a gesture of gratitude for his saving his son. When Sieverts selects the white mare Lee realizes that Sieverts is dishonest, but says nothing. Ed sees Sievert riding through town with the horses. When the man will not release the mare Ed shoots him. Jailed once again, he shoots a deputy and escapes. He is tracked down by Lee and their confrontation escalates to the point where Ed issues a challenge and prepares to draw on his father. Lee shoots and kills his son. Lee returns to town with the body and, having reflected on his own life, asks Davy and Clee to join him in taking Ed’s body back to the ranch.

Cast
 Van Heflin as Lee Hackett
 Tab Hunter as Ed Hackett 
 Kathryn Grant as Clee Chouard
 James Darren as Davy Hackett
 Mickey Shaughnessy as Deputy Sheriff Will Motely
 Robert F. Simon as Sheriff Harry Brill
 Edward Platt as Purcell Avery
 Ray Teal as Jensen Sieverts
 Paul Birch as Bob Selkirk, Lee's caretaker
 Will Wright as Judge
 Bert Convy as Paul Chouard (uncredited)
 Chief Blue Eagle as Black Horse, Indian (uncredited)
 Paul Bryar as Saloon bartender (uncredited)
 Harry Antrim as Doctor (uncredited)
 Everett Glass as Rev. Arthur Stotheby (uncredited)
 Dorothy Adams as Martha Stotheby (uncredited)

Production notes
Ric Hardman wrote the original script and it was adapted by Frank Nugent. Van Heflin signed to star in August 1957. Rudolph Mate was originally meant to be the director but he dropped out (he would be replaced by Phil Karlson). Tab Hunter was borrowed from Warner Bros.

Columbia contractee James Darren was assigned to a support role. Filming started in November 1957.

Director Phil Karlson says the film reduced Columbia studio head Harry Cohn to tears. "He had two sons and this was a story about a father and two sons. He identified completely."

Reception
The Los Angeles Times said it was "moviemaking at its best".

Legacy
Quentin Tarantino later said the film was an inspiration for Tanner the fictitious movie starring Rick Dalton in Once Upon a Time in Hollywood.

See also
 List of American films of 1958

References

External links
 
 
 
 
Review of film at Cinema Retro

1958 films
1958 Western (genre) films
American Western (genre) films
Columbia Pictures films
Films scored by George Duning
Films directed by Phil Karlson
1950s English-language films
1950s American films